Kelly Jones and Robert Van't Hof were the defending champions, but Jones did not participate this year.  Van't Hof partnered Brian Garrow, losing in the first round.

Sergio Casal and Emilio Sánchez won the title, defeating Grant Connell and Glenn Michibata 4–6, 6–3, 6–4 in the final.

Seeds

  Grant Connell /  Glenn Michibata (final)
  Sergio Casal /  Emilio Sánchez (champions)
  Omar Camporese /  Javier Sánchez (quarterfinals)
  Eric Jelen /  Udo Riglewski (first round)

Draw

Draw

External links
Draw

ATP Auckland Open
1991 ATP Tour